BOK Tower (named for the Bank of Oklahoma; formerly known as One Williams Center) is a skyscraper in Downtown Tulsa, Oklahoma. At 203 m (667 ft) in height, the 52-story tower was the tallest building in Oklahoma until surpassed by Devon Tower in 2011. It was built in 1976 and designed by Minoru Yamasaki & Associates, the same architect who designed the World Trade Center's Twin Towers in New York City. This structure is very similar to the WTC towers in appearance and construction.

Design and history 
BOK Tower's lobby has marble walls and wall hangings similar to those in the former World Trade Center's Twin Towers in New York. BOK Tower was built for the Williams Companies, whose CEO at the time, John Williams, was impressed by the Twin Towers and originally wanted to build two 25-story replicas in Tulsa. However, prior to construction, Williams was informed that having two separate towers would require more elevators than a single, larger tower. The plan for a quarter scale replica was then changed to a single 52-story tower, double the height of the two planned towers. The similarities to the World Trade Center led executives to joke that the architects just halved the plans for a World Trade Center tower.

BOK Tower, as completed, was the tallest building in Oklahoma and contained  of office space. Within four months of its completion, BOK Tower was 80 percent occupied.

In December 2005, a water main broke and flooded electrical equipment in the basement. In 2006, BOK Tower underwent $16 million in repairs and renovations. $6 million was spent on renovated pedestrian bridges, granite coating for the base, new fitness centers, and windows. The remaining $10 million was used to fix damage from the 2005 flood.

See also
List of tallest buildings by U.S. state
List of tallest buildings in Oklahoma
List of tallest buildings in Tulsa

References

Skyscraper office buildings in Tulsa, Oklahoma
Bank company headquarters in the United States
Buildings and structures in Tulsa, Oklahoma
Office buildings completed in 1976
Minoru Yamasaki buildings
International style architecture in Oklahoma